Comac is the Commercial Aircraft Corporation of China.

COMAC or Comac may also refer to:
 Comac (youth movement), a Belgian socialist student movement
 Commack, New York, formerly spelled as Comac, New York